Schistonema is a group of plants in the family Apocynaceae first described as a genus in 1906. It contains only one known species, Schistonema weberbaueri, native to the Cajamarca region of Peru.

References

Monotypic Apocynaceae genera
Asclepiadoideae
Endemic flora of Peru